Middletown is an unincorporated community in Jefferson Township, Crawford County, Ohio, United States.

History
Middletown was laid out circa 1835.

References

Populated places in Crawford County, Ohio